Ryle may refer to:

People
Ryle Nugent Sports Presenter
Anthony Ryle (1927–2016), psychotherapist
Edward Ryle (1885–1952), British athlete and competitor in the 1908 Summer Olympic Games
Gerard Ryle (born 1965), Australian journalist
Gilbert Ryle (1900–1976), English philosopher
Glenn Ryle (1927–1993), American television personality, in Ohio
Herbert Edward Ryle (1856–1925), Old Testament scholar in England
J. C. Ryle (John Charles Ryle, 1816–1900), Anglican bishop of Liverpool
John Ryle (disambiguation), any of several people
Martin Ryle (1918–1984), English astronomer
Mary Danforth Ryle (1833–1904), American philanthropist
William Ryle (1834–1881), American businessman in the silk industry

Other uses
Ryle, Kentucky
Ryle High School
Ryle Telescope

See also
Ryles (disambiguation)

lv:Rails